The Wray Fish Hatchery is a Colorado Parks and Wildlife warm and cold water fish production facility located near Chief Creek and Stalker Lake in Yuma County.

History
Wray Fish Hatchery was inaugurated in 1939. In 2012, the facility began using Longmont's Burch Lake to breed muskellunge which was a step in obtaining a tiger muskie population in Colorado. Before deposition, the females were crossed with northern pike.

Fish Species
Hatchery staff works to support the raising of broodstock black crappie, bluegill, and redear sunfish; other species, including walleye, saugeye, channel catfish, wiper, tiger muskie, and grass carp originate at other Colorado warm water lakes and hatcheries, or are traded from out-of-state.

References 

Fish hatcheries in the United States
Buildings and structures in Yuma County, Colorado
Tourist attractions in Colorado